Granville is an unincorporated community in Monroe County, in the U.S. state of Missouri.

History
A post office called Granville was established in 1858, and remained in operation until 1907. The community has the name of Granville Giles, an early settler.

References

Unincorporated communities in Monroe County, Missouri
Unincorporated communities in Missouri